Canisy is a commune in the Manche department in Normandy in north-western France. On 1 January 2017, the former commune of Saint-Ébremond-de-Bonfossé was merged into Canisy.

Heraldry

See also
Communes of the Manche department
Chateau de Canisy

References

Communes of Manche